Marianne Leeson (born 19 October 1987 in Burlington, Ontario) is a Canadian snowboarder. She competed in the slalom events at the 2014 Winter Olympics for Canada and placed 5th. Highest ever finish of a Canadian Female Alpine Snowboarder at the Olympic games.

References

External links
 
 

1987 births
Living people
Canadian female snowboarders
Snowboarders at the 2014 Winter Olympics
Olympic snowboarders of Canada
Sportspeople from Burlington, Ontario